Labarthe is a commune in the Gers department in southwestern France.

Geography

Population

See also
Communes of the Gers department

References

Communes of Gers